James Kennedy (31 August 1932 – 21 February 2007) was an English cricketer. Kennedy was a left-handed batsman who bowled slow left-arm orthodox. He was born in Hartlepool, County Durham.

Kennedy made his debut for Durham against the Warwickshire Second XI in the 1966 Minor Counties Championship. He played Minor counties cricket for Durham from 1966 to 1968, making 17 Minor Counties Championship appearances. He made his List A debut against Nottinghamshire in the 1967 Gillette Cup. In this match, he scored 5 runs before being dismissed by Barry Stead. He made a further List A appearance against Worcestershire in the 1968 Gillette Cup. He was dismissed for 23 runs in this match by Brian Brain, with Worcestershire winning by 16 runs.

He died in the town of his birth on 21 February 2007.

References

External links
Jim Kennedy at ESPNcricinfo
Jim Kennedy at CricketArchive

1932 births
2007 deaths
Sportspeople from Hartlepool
English cricketers
Durham cricketers
Cricketers from County Durham